Phaea phthisica is a species of beetle in the family Cerambycidae. It was described by Henry Walter Bates in 1881. It is known from Costa Rica, Mexico and Panama.

References

phthisica
Beetles described in 1881